Hexlet may refer to:

Soddy's hexlet, in geometry a chain of six spheres, each of which is tangent to both of its neighbors and also to three mutually tangent given spheres
Hexlet (computing), a group of 128 bits in computing

See also
Hextet